Hendrik Jan "Hans" Pluijgers (13 October 1886 in Rotterdam – 7 December 1974 in Wassenaar) was a sailor from the Netherlands, who represented his native country at the 1928 Summer Olympics in Amsterdam. Pluijgers as helmsman on the Dutch 6 Metre Kemphaan took the 4th place with crew members: Hans Fokker, Carl Huisken, Wim Schouten and Roeffie Vermeulen.

Sources
 
 
 

Dutch male sailors (sport)

Olympic sailors of the Netherlands
Sailors at the 1928 Summer Olympics – 6 Metre
Sportspeople from Rotterdam
1886 births
1974 deaths
20th-century Dutch people